North of the Yukon may refer to:

 North of Hudson Bay, a 1923 film starring Tom Mix that was released in Great Britain as North of the Yukon
 North of the Yukon (1939 film), a 1939 film
 North of the Yukon (Disney comics), a 1965 Scrooge McDuck comic